Reina Prinsen Geerligs (7 October 1922 - 24 November 1943) was a member of the Dutch Resistance during World War II. After the war the literary Reina Prinsen Geerligs Award was created in her memory.

Biography
Reina Prinsen Geerligs was born in 1922 in Semarang, Dutch East Indies, the daughter of the chemist Johan Prinsen Geerligs and his wife Helen Carolina Zon. She had a brother who was two years younger. They moved to Amsterdam when she was still very young.

In the Netherlands, Prinsen Geerligs was a member of the Youth Organisation for the Study of Nature, and she started writing poetry and prose. But when the war started, she mostly stopped writing and concentrated on her work with the resistance, initially mainly as a courier. Her house became the meeting place for resistance group CS-6, and Reina Prinsen Geerligs became involved with at least two assassination attempts. In 1943 she and Louis Boissevain tried to kill police officer Pieter Kaay, but stopped the attempt when they saw Kaay seated with a child in his lap. Another group executed him the next day.

Prinsen Geerligs was arrested on 23 July 1943, and confessed to her work as a resistance fighter. In November 1943 she and some other members of the resistance group were transported to Sachsenhausen concentration camp, where they were executed the next day.

Her parents only learned of her death in 1946. With the money they had set apart to finance her studies, they created a fund for a literary award in her honour, the Reina Prinsen Geerligs Award, given to a young writer between the ages of 20 and 25, and which was won by some of the most prominent Dutch writers at the start of their career, including Gerard Reve and Harry Mulisch. It was last awarded in 1979.

Reina Prinsen Geerligs Award
1947: Gerard Reve
1948: Mies Bouhuys
1949: Willem Witkampf
1950: Jan Blokker
1951: Harry Mulisch
1952: Kees Stempels
1953: Remco Campert
1953: Ellen Warmond
1954: Henk Meijer
1955: W.G. Klooster
1956: Winny Pendèl
1959: J. Bernlef
1960: A.P. van Hoek
1961: Peter van Gestel
1962: Steven Membrecht
1964: Kees Holierhoek
1965: Henk van Kerkwijk
1967: Eddy van Vliet
1968: Hans Vlek
1970: Arie van den Berg
1972: Willem Jan Otten
1973: Frans Kusters
1976: Oek de Jong
1976: Jotie T'Hooft
1979: Leon de Winter

Notes

Further reading

1922 births
1943 deaths
Dutch resistance members
Dutch people executed by Nazi Germany
People who died in Sachsenhausen concentration camp
People from Semarang
Female resistance members of World War II
Dutch people of the Dutch East Indies